A special election was held in  on November 29, 1798, to fill a vacancy left by the death of Representative-election Joshua Seney (DR) before the start of the 6th Congress.

Election results

Nicholson took his seat with the rest of the 6th Congress at the start of the 1st session.

See also
List of special elections to the United States House of Representatives

References

Maryland 1798 07
Maryland 1798 07
1798 07
Maryland 07
United States House of Representatives
United States House of Representatives 1798 07